Ginevra de' Benci (1457–1521) was a member of the Benci family in Florence and is the subject of an early portrait by Leonardo da Vinci. 

Ginevra was born into a family of wealthy Florentine merchants in 1457. The Benci had business dealings with the Medici and were noted humanists themselves, patronizing artists and writers and creating an important library of classical texts. In 1474 she married Luigi de Bernardo Niccolini. Bernardo Bembo, Lorenzo de' Medici, Alessandro Braccesi, and Christoforo Landino dedicated poems to her.

She spent her later life in self imposed exile, trying to recover from illness and an ill fated love affair. She died in 1521 aged 63 or 64, likely from this unknown illness.

References

1457 births
1521 deaths
Italian artists' models
15th-century Italian women
15th-century people of the Republic of Florence
16th-century people of the Republic of Florence
Nobility from Florence